Shaksha (Şaqşa) is a rural locality (a village) in Kaltymanovsky Selsoviet, Iglinsky District, Bashkortostan, Russia. The population was 290 as of 2010. There are 10 streets.

Geography 
Shaksha is located 20 km southwest of Iglino (the district's administrative centre) by road. Svetlaya is the nearest rural locality.

References 

Rural localities in Iglinsky District